Kim Gap-sun( May 22, 1872 – 1961) was a Joseon Dynasty bureaucrat and modern Korean businessman, politician, and realtor. he was officials from slavery and large landowner of Chungcheongnam-do, Japanese colonial time of Korea.

In his early life he was successively Governor of Buyeo County (1902), Nosung County (1903–1905, 1907–1910), Gongju County (1906–1907, 1910), Kimhwa County (1908–1910), and Asan county (1910–1911). His art name was Sungap, and his courtesy name was Dongwu.

Site link 
 Kim Gap-sun 
 Kim Gap-sun

References

Joseon people
Korean politicians
20th-century Korean businesspeople
Japanese politicians
1872 births
1961 deaths